A desktop environment is a collection of software designed to give functionality and a certain look and feel to an operating system.

This article applies to operating systems which are capable of running the X Window System, mostly Unix and Unix-like operating systems such as Linux, Minix, illumos, Solaris, AIX, FreeBSD and Mac OS X. Microsoft Windows is incapable of natively running X applications; however, third-party X servers like Cygwin/X, Exceed, or Xming are available.

Technical elements of a desktop environment 

A desktop environment (DE) can be broken up into several components that function independently and interact with one another to provide the look and feel and functionality of the desktop environment. A fundamental part of a DE is the window manager or WM. A window manager creates a certain way for application windows to present themselves to the user. It manages the various application windows, keeping track of which ones are open and providing features to switch between them. Another important element of a DE is the file manager. This application manages files/ folders and presents them in a way that the user finds convenient. It provides file operations like viewing, copying or moving, changing permissions and deleting. DEs usually provide utilities to set wallpapers and screensavers, display icons on the desktop, and perform some administrative tasks. They may optionally include word processors, CD/DVD writing applications, web browsers and e-mail clients.

There are some exceptions: Window managers like Fluxbox, wmii and Ratpoison operate independently of a desktop environment and were written with this objective in mind. Additional hand-picked applications add functionality such as a panel and volume management which gives them some of the qualities of a full DE. This contrasts the behaviour of WMs like Metacity and KWin which were not written with the objective of operating independently of a DE.

KDE Software Compilation and GNOME are written almost completely on special software libraries Qt and GTK respectively. This usually means that virtually every component of the desktop environment including the file manager explicitly depends on that library for its functioning.

Notably, nothing prevents the user from installing any number of software libraries of their choice. In practice, software written on major libraries can be run under any desktop environment. Running a package designed for one desktop (which essentially means that it's written using the same libraries as the desktop itself is) within a different desktop can be visually displeasing, as well as incurring the RAM penalty of loading libraries that wouldn't otherwise be required.

Some of the differences which can influence the choice of desktop environment are:
 Look and feel of the desktop environment. The user will be more comfortable with a certain look and feel that they may or may not already be familiar with.
 Flexibility and configurability of the desktop environment. A sophisticated user might want a highly configurable desktop environment to make the desktop environment work the way they want. A beginning user might just want an easy-to-use environment to which they will adjust.
 Personal preferences for choice of software, which has two aspects:
 Each desktop environment comes packaged with various default software and various "ways things are done" under that desktop. A casual user might like a highly integrated graphical interface to change various settings while a more experienced user might prefer to use individual configuration utilities or even CLI tools.
 Desktops are also often closely tied into various major functional components of the desktop manager (example: file manager, browser, word processor); whilst "mix and match" is possible, it is generally pleasing to make choices which result in a consistent look and feel of programs under the chosen desktop environment. Making choices based on what software integrates with a chosen desktop environment necessarily limits the weight that can be given to other application features.

Desktop comparison information

Overview

Default programs packaged 
This table shows basic information on the programs distributed with some desktop environments for the X Window System.

Note that Razor-qt has become LXQt, a port of LXDE to the Qt framework.

Comparison of ease of use and stability 
GNOME's graphical file manager Files (Nautilus) is intended to be very easy to use and has many features. KDE's file manager Dolphin is described as focused on usability.  Prior to KDE version 4, the KDE project's standard file manager was Konqueror, which was also designed for ease of use.

Both GNOME and KDE come with many graphical configuration tools, reducing the need to manually edit configuration files for new users. They have extensive bundled software such as graphical menu editors, text editors, audio players, and software for doing administrative work. All applications installed in most distributions are automatically added to the GNOME and KDE menus. No major configuration changes are necessary to begin working. However, by using graphical tools, the extent to which the desktops can be configured is determined by the power provided by those tools.

Compatibility and interoperability issues 
Some desktop environments and window managers claim that they support applications made for other desktop environments explicitly. For example, Fluxbox states KDE support in its feature list. Using software made specifically for the desktop environment in use or window manager agnostic software is a way to avoid issues. For software developers, the Portland Project has released a set of common interfaces that allows applications to integrate across many desktop environments.

System resources utilization

A 2011 test by Phoronix with the default installation of Ubuntu 10.04 showed that LXDE 0.5's memory utilization was lower than that of Xfce 4.6, which in turn was lower than that of GNOME 2.29, with KDE 4.4 using the most RAM compared to the aforementioned desktops.

In 2015, it was demonstrated in benchmarks that LXDE performed slightly faster than Xfce overall (in the average of all tests), using the Fedora Linux operating system.

See also 

 Comparison of X window managers
 Comparison of file managers
 Croquet Project
 DistroWatch – a website containing information on several hundred distributions
 freedesktop.org
 Minimalism (computing)
 Software bloat

References

External links
 Best Linux desktop of 2018 TechRadar 
 Fedora 24: Comparing Gnome, KDE Plasma, Cinnamon, MATE, Xfce, LXDE ZDNet
 Freedom of choice: 7 top Linux desktop environments compared PC World
 11 Best Linux Desktop Environments And Their Comparison | 2018 Edition fossbytes.com
 The 10 Best Linux Desktop Environments lifewire.com
 7 Best Desktop Environments For Linux itsfoss.com
 What is the difference between Gnome, KDE, Xfce & LXDE pclosmag.com
 Should You Use a Window Manager as Your Desktop Environment? makeuseof.com
 Six Popular Linux Desktop Environments techspot.com
 10 Best and Most Popular Linux Desktop Environments of All Time tecmint.com
 5 Best Linux Desktop Environments With Pros & Cons linuxandubuntu.com
 The 8 Best Ubuntu Desktop Environments (18.04 Bionic Beaver Linux) linuxconfig.org
 Best New Linux Desktop Environments Datamation
 6 reasons why GNOME is still the best Linux desktop environment opensource.com
 Best Linux Desktop Environments for 2016 linux.com
 WTF Desktop Environments: GNOME, KDE, and More Explained Lifehacker
 A visual history of OS desktop environments NetworkWorld

 
X Window System desktop environments